Henri Chabrol (11 January 1897 – 1981) was a French writer. A graduate from the École Normale Supérieure (class 1919), he edited texts of classical antiquity, novels and plays (in French), poems and collections of stories (in French and Provençal)

Works 
1930: La chair est forte,
1931: Jeunesse du monde,
1943: L'Honnête Florentine, four-act comedy,
1947: La Vautour,
1971 À ciel ouvert,
1976: Le Mystère du Taureau; Prix René Bardet 1977.
1977: Prix Broquette-Gonin for his lifetime achievement in poetry.

References 

Winners of the Prix Broquette-Gonin (literature)
20th-century French non-fiction writers
20th-century French male writers
École Normale Supérieure alumni
1897 births
1981 deaths